the Cape needlefish (Petalichthys capensis) is a species of needlefish endemic to coastal South Africa.
P. capensis is found in large schools in pelagic-oceanic environments in subtropical climates. The typical length of this species is about 30 cm (12 in). Body colouration is a silver and blueish colour. The eggs of this species can be found hanging onto objects in the water, as they have tendrils that latch onto the objects.

References

Further reading
 

Belonidae
Endemic fish of South Africa
Marine fish of South Africa
Fish described in 1904